The Escape is a 1998 Canadian action TV movie directed by Stuart Gillard starring Patrick Dempsey.

Plot
A falsely imprisoned young man attempts an escape from a prison work detail in Louisiana ten years later.

Cast
 Patrick Dempsey as Clayton
 Brigitte Bako as Sarah
 Colm Feore as Hickman
 Vincent Gale as Newby
 Nathaniel DeVeaux as Moses
 Gouchy Boy as Pooch
 Jason Gray-Stanford as Young Guard

Release
The film bears a 1994 copyright but it was not until 1998 that it aired on The Movie Channel and was then released on home video.

Home video
The film was released on VHS for home video release on October 13, 1998. It was later released for streaming on Netflix and Amazon Video.

References

External links

1998 films
1998 action films
Action television films
1990s English-language films
Films directed by Stuart Gillard
Films scored by Loek Dikker
Canadian television films
English-language Canadian films
Canadian action films
Films set in Louisiana
1990s Canadian films